Futaba Dam  is an asphalt dam located in Hokkaido Prefecture in Japan. The dam is used for irrigation. The catchment area of the dam is 63.4 km2. The dam impounds about 64  ha of land when full and can store 10450 thousand cubic meters of water. The construction of the dam was started on 1966 and completed in 1987.

References

Dams in Hokkaido